The Twelve Chairs is a classic satirical novel by the Odesan Soviet authors Ilf and Petrov, published in 1928. Its plot follows characters attempting to obtain jewelry hidden in a chair. A sequel was published in 1931. The novel has been adapted to other media, primarily film.

Plot

In the Soviet Union in 1927, during the  NEP era, a former Marshal of the Nobility, Ippolit Matveyevich "Kisa" Vorobyaninov, works as the registrar of marriages and deaths in a sleepy provincial town. His mother-in-law reveals on her deathbed that her family jewellery was hidden from the Bolsheviks in one of the twelve chairs from the family's dining-room set. Those chairs, along with all other personal property, were taken away by the  Communists after the 1917 Russian Revolution. Vorobyaninov wants to find the treasure. The “smooth operator” and  con-man Ostap Bender forces Kisa to become his partner, and they set out to find the chairs. Bender's street-smarts and charm are invaluable to the reticent Kisa, and Bender comes to dominate the enterprise.

The "conсessioners" trace the chairs, which are to be sold at auction in Moscow. They fail to buy them and learn that the chairs have been split up for resale individually. Roaming all over the Soviet Union in their quest to recover the furniture, they have a series of comic adventures, including living in a students' dormitory with plywood walls, posing as bill-painters on a riverboat to earn passage, bamboozling a village chess-club with promises of an international tournament, and traveling on foot through the mountains of Georgia. Father Fyodor (who had known of the treasure from the  confession of Vorobyaninov's mother-in-law), their obsessed rival in the hunt for the treasure, follows a bad lead, runs out of money, ends up trapped on a mountain-top, and loses his sanity. Ostap remains unflappable, and his mastery of human nature eliminates all obstacles, but Vorobyaninov steadily deteriorates.

They slowly acquire each of the chairs in turn, but no treasure is found. Kisa and Ostap finally discover the location of the last chair. Vorobyaninov murders Ostap to keep all the loot for himself, but discovers that the jewels have already been found and used to build the new public recreation center in which the chair was found, a symbol of the new society. Angered, Vorobyaninov loses his sanity.

Legacy

Sequel

Ostap Bender reappears in the book's sequel The Little Golden Calf, despite his apparent death in The Twelve Chairs.

Adaptations
The novel has inspired at least twenty adaptations in the Soviet Union and abroad:

 The first cinematic adaptation of the novel is the joint Polish-Czech film Dvanáct křesel (1933). The original plot was considerably altered, yet many following adaptations were primarily based on this film rather than on the novel itself (e.g., the former marshal of nobility from the novel was replaced in the Polish-Czech film by a barber who then appeared in several later adaptations).

 In England, the book inspired the film Keep Your Seats, Please (1936), directed by Monty Banks at Ealing Studios and starring George Formby. The action takes place in Britain and involves seven chairs, not twelve.

 In Nazi Germany, the film Thirteen Chairs (1938) is based on the novel. However, the film does not credit the novel's authors.

 Dmitri Shostakovich's unfinished operetta The Twelve Chairs (1939) is based on the novel.

 In Hollywood, the comedy It's in the Bag! (1945) starring Fred Allen is very loosely based on the novel, using just five chairs.

 A Brazilian version called Thirteen Chairs (1957) stars comedians Oscarito, Renata Fronzi, and Zé Trindade. In this version, the main character, played by Oscarito, inherits his aunt's mansion, which is soon confiscated, leaving him with only 13 chairs. After selling them, he finds out that his aunt had hidden her fortune in the chairs. He then goes on a quest to get the chairs back.

 Tomás Gutiérrez Alea made a Cuban version titled Las Doce Sillas (1962) with Reynaldo Miravalles as Ostap. Set in a tropical context, in this version the hero "sees the light", becomes corrected and joins Cuban revolutionary youth in zafra campaign (sugar cane harvesting).

 The story also served as the basis for the 1969 film The Thirteen Chairs starring Sharon Tate.

 A Syrian TV series entitled Hamam al-Hana (1968) is based on the premise of this novel. It involves three guys looking for the hidden treasure (a stash of money) all over Damascus, with a chair for every episode. In the last episode, they find the right chair, but the treasure turns out to be old paper money which by then had become useless. 

 Mel Brooks made a version titled The Twelve Chairs (1970), following the novel more closely, but with a happier ending. Frank Langella plays the part of Ostap Bender, Ron Moody plays Vorobyaninov, and Dom DeLuise plays Father Fyodor.

 In the 1970s, two adaptations were made in the USSR: a film in 1971 by Leonid Gaidai with Archil Gomiashvili as Bender and a miniseries in 1976 by Mark Zakharov with Andrei Mironov as Bender.

See also 
 The Adventure of the Six Napoleons

Notes

References

External links

 .
  at the Internet Archive

1928 Russian novels
Collaborative novels
Soviet novels 
Russian novels adapted into films
Ukrainian novels adapted into films
Russian humour
Ukrainian humour
Ukrainian novels
Fiction set in 1927
Ilf and Petrov
Picaresque novels
Russian novels adapted into television shows
Russian satirical novels